Shrirangapattana railway station (station code: S) is a railway station on Mysore–Bangalore railway line in Mandya district of Karnataka state of India.

Mysore railway division 
Mysore railway division is one of the three railway divisions under South Western Railway zone of Indian Railways. This railway division was formed on 5 November 1951 and its headquarters is located at Mysore in the state of Karnataka in India.

Bangalore railway division and Hubli railway division are the other railway divisions under SWR Zone headquartered at Hubli.
The South Western Railway is one of the seventeen Indian Railways zones in India.

See also
 Naganahalli
 Pandavapura
 Chandagiri Koppal
 Byadarahalli
 Yeliyur
 Mandya
 Mysore–Bangalore railway line

References

External links

Mysore railway division
SHRIRANGAPATTANA